A dory is a small, shallow-draft boat.

Dory may also refer to:

People
 Dory Chamoun (born 1931), Lebanese politician
 Charles Dory Dean (1852-1935), Major League Baseball pitcher
 Dorrel Dory Dixon (born 1935), Jamaican retired professional wrestler
 Dorrance Dory Funk (1919-1973), professional wrestler
 Dorrance Dory Funk, Jr. (born 1941), professional wrestler and trainer, son of Dory Funk
 Dory Lobel (born 1980), American musician, songwriter, composer and producer
 Dory Previn (1925-2012), American lyricist, singer, songwriter and poet
 Dorry Segev, Israeli-born Marjory K. and Thomas Pozefsky Professor of Surgery at Johns Hopkins University School of Medicine, Professor of Epidemiology at Johns Hopkins Bloomberg School of Public Health, and Associate Vice Chair of the Department of Surgery at Johns Hopkins Hospital
 Jonathan Dory, NASA Human Systems Integration Lead and aquanaut

Arts and entertainment
 Dory (Finding Nemo), a character in the Finding Nemo franchise
 A song from the album Veckatimest by Grizzly Bear

Places
 Dory Nunatak, a nunatak in Victoria Land, Antarctica
 Dory or Doros, Byzantine name for Mangup, a fortress in Crimea

Other uses 
 Dory (fish), several fish species
 Dory (spear), chief weapon of Ancient Greek hoplites
 Dory Fish Market, a beachside fishing cooperative located in the city of Newport Beach, California
 Dory, nickname for Google Moderator, a discontinued service that used crowdsourcing to rank user-submitted questions, suggestions and ideas
 Dory, code name of the LG G Watch smartwatch

See also
 Dory Rips, a phenomenon in the Bay of Fundy
Dori (disambiguation)
Dorie (disambiguation)

Lists of people by nickname
Hypocorisms